The 7th National Assembly of the Federal Republic of Nigeria was a bicameral legislature inaugurated on 6 June 2011 and ran its course till 6 June 2015.
The assembly comprises the Senate and the House of Representatives.
The House of Representative consists of 360 elected members and the Senate, a total of 109 members from which 73 were newly elected and 36 were re-elected across the 6 geopolitical zones of Nigeria.
David Mark, the Senate President of the 6th Assembly was re-elected on the platform of People's Democratic Party and Aminu Waziri Tambuwal, the Speaker of the House of Representatives was also re-elected on the same platform following the 11 April general election.

Members

Principal officers

Officers of the Senate
The table below outlined the Principal Officers of the Senate.

Officers of the House of Representative

Rt. Hon. Aminu Waziri Tambuwal – Speaker House of Representatives
Rt. Hon. Emeka Ihedioha – Deputy Speaker House of Representatives
Hon. Mulikat Akande Adeola – House Leader
Hon. Ishaka Mohammed Bawa -Majority Whip
Hon. Leonard Okuweh Ogor -Deputy House Leader
Hon. Ahmed Mukhtar Mohammed – Deputy Chief Whip
Hon. Femi Gbajabiamila – Minority Leader
Hon. Samson Raphael Osagie – Minority Whip
Hon. Kawu Sumaila – Deputy Minority Leader
Hon. Garba Datti Muhammad – Deputy Minority Whip

References

External links 
 Official website of the Nigerian National Assembly 
 Assemblyonline news on the National Assembly
 Official People and Legislature Information Interchange

Politics of Nigeria
7th
Nigeria
2011 in Nigeria
2012 in Nigeria
2013 in Nigeria
2014 in Nigeria
2015 in Nigerian politics